Hammer of the Gods is a 2013 British action film directed by Farren Blackburn and released on 5 July 2013. In it, a dying Viking king sends his son on a quest to seek out his older brother, the clan's only hope of defeating an approaching enemy horde.

Plot

Britain 871 AD. Young Norse prince Steinar arrives in England with a complement of 500 reserve warriors to combat a Saxon uprising that is crushing the occupying forces led by his father, King Bagsecg. Arriving at his father's camp, Steiner attends a family meeting with his father, his older brother Harold, and their younger half brother Vali, who is disliked by everyone but Steinar for being half Saxon. Absent is their older brother, Hakan, who has not been seen for over a decade due to a bitter animosity between him and their father, the cause unknown to Steinar.

Bagsecg, who is bedridden and dying, dreads leaving the throne to Harold (now next in line due to Hakan's absence) whose insistence that diplomacy, rather than being their best option, would instead put their clan under English rule. He orders Steinar to kill Vali for cowardice, to test his strength as a leader.

Steinar refuses and warns Harold off, who attempts it himself to gain favour with their father. Furious, Bagsecg dismisses Harold and Vali and charges Steinar with a near impossible task. Despite still harbouring contempt for his eldest son, Bagsecg orders Steinar to venture deep into the hostile English lands to find Hakan and bring him back so he may assume the throne.

Steinar departs with his closest comrades: his close friend Hagen, a Berserker named Grim, and Jokul, a superstitious believer in omens. Later they are joined by Vali who warns he has witnessed Harold secretly meeting with the Saxon King. Despite the urgency to return, Steinar pushes forward.

They approach Ivar the Boneless, a Viking recluse and sodomite who lives with a slave girl named Agnes and a mute catamite. He agrees to lead them to where he believes Hakan to be and departs with Agnes while abandoning the latter.

The group however are pursued by hooded men who slay Grim and later capture them all. Revealed to be soldiers of the Christian faith, their captain confirms that Harold has been secretly negotiating a surrender, on condition he remains in power over his people. But the captain proposes to Steinar that he would be best suited to rule his clan, if he would agree to submit to Christianity. Steinar refuses, knowing the stranglehold Christians would have on his people. Vali, however, switches sides to save his own neck and is taken to a nearby church, while Ivar is castrated for biting off the ear of a soldier.

Agnes (who had evaded capture) frees Steinar, who then frees Hagen and Jokul. Ivar dies from blood loss but tells Steinar where he may find Hakan. They rescue Vali, but Hagen and Jokul demand he be killed for his cowardice and treachery, forcing Steinar to kill Hagen by duel to protect his brother.

Now down to four, they head into an eerie forest and are captured again, this time by a tribe who dwell deep within a nearby cave. Taken there, Jokul is killed and later served up as the tribe's banquet, Vali again switches sides, while Agnes is claimed by the tribal chief, Steinar's older brother Hakan, who the tribe worship as a god.

During the tribal festivities, Steinar encounters his mother Astrid, whom he believed dead, and who is also deluded by Hakan's megalomania. Further shocking revelations are made as Steinar finally learns the truth behind Hakan's exile. To his disgust, his mother and brother openly share a passionate kiss, revealing their incestuous relationship.

After Hakan kills Vali to further his dominance over the tribe, he and Steinar are lowered into a dark pit to fight to the death. Despite Astrid secretly handing Hakan a knife to win, Steinar emerges the victor. The tribe bow in submission while Astrid, in an attempt to kill Steinar, is thrown into the pit by him.

Steinar later returns to Bagsecg's camp with Agnes, and presents Hakan's head to his father. Harold argues he was supposed to bring Hakan back alive. But Bagsecg responds "He was sent to find a king" seeing that Steinar is now ready to lead their people and gives him full command of the Nordic Army.

Steinar then kills Harold for his treachery and weakness, much to Bagsecg's applause who can now rest easy knowing the kingdom is in good hands. Later, with Agnes by his side who is now his wife and queen, he musters his army to confront the approaching Saxon forces which he orders to charge with him leading it.

Cast
 Charlie Bewley as Prince Steinar
 Clive Standen as Hagen
 Michael Jibson as Grim
 James Cosmo as King Bagsecg
 Elliot Cowan as Hakan
 Guy Flanagan as Jokul
 Glynis Barber as Astrid
 Ivan Kaye as Ivar
 Alexandra Dowling as Agnes
 Finlay Robertson as Prince Harold 
 Francis Magee as Ulric The Chronicler 
 Salomon Thomson as Wilfred 
 Michael Lindall as Leader Saxon 
 Laura Sibbick as Woman Saxon
 Theo Barklem-Biggs as Prince Vali

Reception
On review aggregator Rotten Tomatoes, Hammer of the Gods holds an approval rating of 29%, based on 21 reviews, and an average rating of 3.98/10. On Metacritic, the film has a weighted average score of 44 out of 100, based on 5 critics, indicating "mixed or average reviews".

Tom Huddleston of Time Out London rated it 3/5 stars and wrote "It's hardly high art, but for a cheapjack homegrown action flick this is surprisingly solid." Philip French of The Observer called it "a nasty, brutal and relatively short entertainment, aimed at middle-of-the-woad Conanists." Peter Beech of The Guardian rated it 3/5 stars and wrote "A sense of humour and some pyrotechnically gory skirmishes enliven this tale of a Viking in hostile Saxon terrain". Matt Glasby of Total Film rated it 2/5 stars and wrote "Gamely directed and acted, but a little threadbare in terms of plot and design, it’s suitably savage but not quite fun enough to forgive the flaws." Dean Essner of Slant Magazine rated it 0.5/5 stars and called it "an unbearably stupid exercise in gore that deserves to die the same cruel, soulless death that nearly every character does at some point".

References

External links
 
 
 Hammer of the Gods: An Interview with director Farren Blackburn

2013 films
2010s action horror films
British action adventure films
Films set in the Viking Age
Films set in the 9th century
Films directed by Farren Blackburn
Films scored by Benjamin Wallfisch
2013 directorial debut films
Vertigo Films films
Incest in film
Films about cannibalism
British action horror films
Cultural depictions of Ivar the Boneless
2010s English-language films
2010s British films